Jack Taggart (3 February 1872 – 1927) was an Irish footballer who played in the Football League for West Bromwich Albion where played in the 1895 FA Cup Final, where they lost 1–0 against Aston Villa.

References

1872 births
1927 deaths
Irish association footballers (before 1923)
Association football midfielders
English Football League players
West Bromwich Albion F.C. players
Pre-1950 IFA international footballers
FA Cup Final players